The 1994 Ontario municipal elections were held on November 14, 1994, to elect mayors, reeves, councillors, and school trustees in all municipalities across Ontario. Some communities also held referendum questions.

The most closely watched contest was in Toronto, where Barbara Hall defeated one-term incumbent June Rowlands for the mayoralty.

Elected mayors
Ajax: James Whitty
Barrie: Janice Laking 
Brampton: Peter Robertson  
Brantford: Chris Friel (details) 
Burlington: Walker Mulkewich 
Cambridge: Jane Brewer 
Clarington: Diane Hamre
East York: Michael Prue
Etobicoke: Doug Holyday
Gloucester: Claudette Cain (details)
Guelph: Joe Young  (details)
Hamilton: Bob Morrow (details) 
Kingston: Gary Bennett 
Kitchener: Richard Christie
London: Dianne Haskett
Markham: Don Cousens
Mississauga: Hazel McCallion
Nepean: Ben Franklin (details)
Niagara Falls: Wayne Thomson 
North Bay: Jack Burrows 
North York: Mel Lastman 
Oakville: Ann Mulvale  
Oshawa: Nancy Diamond
Ottawa: Jacquelin Holzman (details)
Peterborough: Jack Doris
Pickering: Wayne Arthurs  
Richmond Hill: Bill Bell 
Sarnia: Mike Bradley   
Sault Ste. Marie: Joe Fratesi 
Scarborough: Frank Faubert
St. Catharines: Al Unwin
Sudbury: Jim Gordon 
Thunder Bay: David Hamilton
Toronto: Barbara Hall (details)
Vaughan: Lorna Jackson  
Waterloo: Brian Turnbull
Whitby: Tom Edwards
Windsor: Mike Hurst
York: Frances Nunziata

Toronto

References

 
November 1994 events in Canada